The Arts Pasifika Awards celebrate excellence in Pacific arts in New Zealand. The annual awards are administered by Creative New Zealand and are the only national awards for Pasifika artists across all artforms.

The Arts Pasifika Awards include the awards for: Emerging Pacific Artist; Iosefa Enari Memorial Award; Pacific Heritage Art Award (from 2004); Contemporary Pacific Art Award; Senior Pacific Artist Award; Special Recognition Award (from 2013); and Pacific Toa Artist Award (from 2019).

List of award recipients

Emerging Pacific Artist 

 2022 Dahlia Malaeulu
 2021 Vivian Aue
 2020 Pati Solomona Tyrell
 2019 Tyla Veau
 2018 Leki Jackson Bourke
 2017 Tupua Tigafua
 2016 Anonymouz (Matthew Faiumu Salapu)
 2015 Ane Tonga
 2014 Grace Taylor
 2013 Suli Moa 
 2012 Justin Haiu
 2011 Kulimoe'anga 'Stone' Maka 
 2010 Visesio Siasau
 2009 Poulima Salima
 2008 Linda Tuafale Tanoa’I 
 2007 WakaUra Dance Group 
 2006 Tusiata Avia 
 2005 Mīria George 
 2004 Lonnie Hutchinson
 2003 Shigeyuki Kihara 
 2002 Peter Panoa

Iosefa Enari Memorial Award 
 
 2022 Joshua Pearson
 2021 Ridge Ponini
 2020 Moses Mackay
 2019 Samson Setu
 2018 Benson Wilson
 2017 Filipe Manu 
 2016 Madison Nonoa 
 2015 Manase Tapuaki Mei Langi Latu 
 2014 No award given
 2013 Natalia Mann
 2012 Isabella Moore
 2011 Marlena Devoe 
 2010 Pene Junior Pati
 2009 Elisha Na’otala Fa’I
 2008 James Ioelu
 2007 Sani Muamaseali’i
 2006 Aivale Cole
 2005 Ramonda Taleni 
 2004 Bonadventure Allan-Moetaua
 2003 Daphne Collins 
 2002 Ben Makisi

Pacific Heritage Art Award 
This award began in 2004.

 
 2022 Daren Kamali
 2021 Tupumaiaga A Niue Trust
 2020 Cora-Allan Wickliffe
 2019 Louisa Humphry & Kaetaeta Watson
 2018 Sulieti Fieme'a Burrows & Tui Emma Gillies
 2017 Lakiloko Keakea
 2016 Tuaine-Nurse Tamarua Robati
 2015 Joana Monolagi 
 2014 Sinakiteu Women Development Group
 2013 Ioane Aleke Fa’avae
 2012 Atafu Tokelau Community Group 
 2011 Mary Ama and the Pacifica Mamas
 2010 Kalameli Ihaia-Alefosio
 2010 O Mata! Tokelau Dance Group
 2009 Falepipi he Mafola 
 2008 Enuamanu Maruarua Atiu Society
 2007 Dr. Okusi Mahina
 2006 Tau Fuata Niue
 2005 Mafi Malaga III 
 2004 Kepueli Vaomotou

Contemporary Pacific Art Award 
 
 2022 Kulimoe'anga 'Stone' Maka 
 2021 Tupe Lualua
 2020 Tanu Gago
 2019 Anapela Polataivao
 2018 Angela Tiatia
 2017 Kalisolaite Uhila
 2016 Karlo Mila 
 2015 Lonnie Hutchinson
 2014 Dagmar Dyck 
 2013 Victor Rodger
 2012 Ema Tavola 
 2011 Janet Lilo 
 2010 Michel Tuffery
 2009 Shigeyuki Kihara 
 2008 Dianna Fuemana
 2007 Nina Nawalowalo
 2006 Sima Urale 
 2005 John Ioane 
 2004 Lemi Ponifasio (MAU Dance)
 2003 Filipe Tohi 
 2002 Richard Shortland-Cooper

Senior Pacific Artist Award 
 
 2022 Fatu Feu’u
 2021 Andy Leleisi'uao
 2020 Michel Tuffery
 2019 Eteuati Ete
 2018 Rosanna Raymond
 2017 Nina Nawalowalo
 2016 Dave Fane & Oscar Kightley
 2015 Neil Ieremia
 2014 Steve Ma Ching
 2013 Jonathan Lemalu
 2012 Lemi Ponifasio
 2011 Annie Crummer 
 2010 Misa Emma Kesha
 2009 Sopolemalama Filipe Tohi
 2008 Igelese Ete
 2007 Justine Simei-Barton
 2006 Jim Vivieaere
 2005 Opetaia Foa’ai (Te Vaka)
 2004 Nathaniel Lees 
 2003 Albert Wendt 
 2002 Johnny Penisula

Special Recognition Award 
This award began in 2013 to "recognise special contribution to the standing, and standard, of Pacific arts in Aotearoa and/or internationally".
 
 2022 Fa’amoana John Luafutu
 2022 Troy Tu’ua
 2021 Lindah Lepou
 2020 Tanya Muagututi'a
 2019 Glenda Tuaine
 2018 Iosefa Enari
 2017 Noma Sio-Faiumu
 2016 Kolokesa U. Māhina-Tuai
 2015 Lisa Taouma
 2014 Ela To'omaga-Kaikilekofe
 2013 Sean Mallon
 2013 Parris Goebel

Pacific Toa Artist Award 
This award commenced in 2019. It acknowledges the "contribution of a Pasifika artist with the lived experience of disability to the standing, and standard, of Pacific arts nationally or globally".

 2022 Ululau Ama
 2021 Ronnie Tua
 2020 Pelenakeke Brown and Lusi Faiva
 2019 Pati Umaga

References

External links 
 Official website

New Zealand literary awards
New Zealand music awards
New Zealand art awards
Arts organisations based in New Zealand
New Zealand theatre awards